The 2018 Louisiana Ragin' Cajuns baseball team represented the University of Louisiana at Lafayette in the 2018 NCAA Division I baseball season. The Ragin' Cajuns play their home games at M. L. Tigue Moore Field at Russo Park and were led by twenty-fourth year head coach Tony Robichaux.

Preseason

Sun Belt Conference Coaches Poll
The Sun Belt Conference Coaches Poll was released on January 30, 2018. Louisiana was picked to finish first in the West Division with 68 votes and 9 first-place votes.

Preseason All-Sun Belt team
Andrew Crane (TROY, SR, Pitcher)
Trae Patterson (UTA, SR, Pitcher)
Seth Shuman (GASO, SO, Pitcher)
Dylan Moore (LA, SR, Pitcher)
Will Olson (UTA, JR, Catcher)
Wells Davis (USA, JR, 1st Base)
Jonathan Ortega (TXST, JR, 2nd Base)
Drew LaBounty (USA, SR, Shortstop)
Jaylen Hubbard (TXST, JR, 3rd Base)
Brendan Donovan (USA, JR, Outfield)
Brandon Lockridge (TROY, JR, Outfield)
Travis Swaggerty (USA, JR, Outfield)
Omar Salinas (UTA, SR, Designated Hitter)
Dylan Paul (TXST, SR, Utility)

Roster

Coaching staff

Schedule and results

Schedule Source:
*Rankings are based on the team's current ranking in the D1Baseball poll.

References

Louisiana
Louisiana Ragin' Cajuns baseball seasons
Louisiana Ragin' Cajuns baseball